Hoàng Xuân Hãn (Đức Thọ, 1908 – Paris, 10 March 1996) was a Vietnamese professor of mathematics, linguist, historian and educationalist. He was Minister of Education in the short-lived 1945 cabinet of historian Trần Trọng Kim and drafted and issued the first Vietnamese education program.

Like many of the academics in the five-month Trần Trọng Kim government, afterwards Hãn returned to academic studies. He was the first Vietnamese historian to fully study the history of Nôm texts by the 17th Century Jesuits such as Girolamo Maiorica.

See also
Hoàng Xuân Sính, Vietnamese mathematician .

References

1908 births
1996 deaths
People educated at Lycee Albert Sarraut
20th-century Vietnamese mathematicians
People from Hà Tĩnh province
French-language literature of Vietnam